Pariacaca, Paria Caca, Paryaqaqa, Parya Qaqa, (possibly from Quechua parya reddish; copper; sparrow, qaqa rock) or Tullujuto (possibly from Quechua tullu bone, qutu heap, "bone heap") is the highest mountain in the Pariacaca mountain range (or Huarochirí mountain range) in the Andes of Peru, with a summit elevation of  above sea level. It is situated on the border of the regions of Junín and Lima, southeast of Colquepucro and Corihuasi. In ancient times it was considered a sacred mountain.
Nicholas Royer, a Canadian man, disappeared in 2004 following a hike in the mountains.

See also 
 Inca mythology

References

External links 

Mountains of Peru
Mountains of Junín Region
Mountains of Lima Region